Output may refer to:

 The information produced by a computer, see Input/output
 An output state of a system, see state (computer science)
 Output (economics), the amount of goods and services produced
 Gross output in economics, the value of net output or GDP plus intermediate consumption
 Net output in economics, the gross revenue from production less the value of goods and services
 Power (physics) or Work (physics) output of a machine
 Dependent variable of a function, in mathematics
 Output (album)

See also 
 Input (disambiguation)